The women's 100 metre freestyle event at the 2014 Commonwealth Games as part of the swimming programme is scheduled to take place on 27 and 28 July at the Tollcross International Swimming Centre in Glasgow, Scotland.

The medals were presented by Louise Martin, Honorary Secretary of the Commonwealth Games Federation, Immediate Past Chair of Commonwealth Games Scotland and Vice-Chair of Glasgow 2014 and the quaichs were presented by Alfred C. Weir, Chairman of NVT Group.

Records
Prior to this competition, the existing world and Commonwealth Games records were as follows.

The following records were established during the competition:

Results

Heats

Semifinals

Final

References

External links

Women's 100 metre freestyle
Commonwealth Games
2014 in women's swimming